Colom Island (Illa d'en Colom, official name in Catalan) is a small island of , located about  from the north-east coast of Menorca. In the past it was used as a pesthouse and later as farmland. It belonged to the Roca family from Mahón starting in 1904, when it was bought by Mr. Antonio Roca Várez. In 2018, United States billionaire Alex Meruelo purchased the island for 3.2 million Euros. There is a single 100 square meter home on the island.  It is currently part of the Natural Park of the Albufera of Es Grau.

Sale 

In October 2010 it was announced that the island was being sold for roughly six million Euro. It sold for €3.2 million in 2018.

References

Islets of Menorca